Pal Hal is a village in Sangkat Pal Hal, Krong Preah Vihear (City).

Previously, it was in Pal Hal Commune of Tbaeng Meanchey District, Preah Vihear Province, Cambodia. According to the 1998 Census of Cambodia, it had a population of 719 persons.

References

Villages in Cambodia
Populated places in Preah Vihear province